Kurevere may refer to several places in Estonia:

Kurevere, Harju County, village in Kiili Parish, Harju County
Kurevere, Lääne County, village in Martna Parish, Lääne County
Kurevere, Rapla County, village in Vigala Parish, Rapla County
Kurevere, Saare County, village in Kihelkonna Parish, Saare County
Kurevere, Valga County, village in Sangaste Parish, Valga County